Giovanni Niccolò Muscat (1735-c.1800) was a Maltese doctor of law, and a major philosopher. His area of specialisation in philosophy was chiefly jurisprudence.

Life

Beginnings
Muscat was born into a very poor family on March 8, 1735. He seems to have lost his parents at a very young age, for it was his aunt who raised him. Despite her poverty, this aunt worked hard to pay for the young Muscat's formal education. Unfortunately, it is however as yet unknown where he undertook his initial studies. His aunt also paid for his university studies. Again, all that is known is that he studied law but it is not certain where. It might have been at the Collegium Melitense of the Jesuits in Valletta.

Professional career
After finishing his law degree and became a lawyer, Muscat was lucky enough to encounter the good favours of one of the legal scribes (called uditore) of the Grand Master of the Knights Hospitallers, Manuel Pinto da Fonseca, who took him under his wing. This helped Muscat build up a stead clientele which brought him some stable income. At this time he was most likely still in his early twenties.

Marriage
Considering his firm social improvement and advancement, it might be expected that Muscat would be particularly susceptible to social mores and customs. However, this was not so. When it came to tying the knot, Muscat chose to flouted convention completely. In fact, at the age of twenty-eight, in 1763, he married a widow with three children who was much older than him. Her name was Maria Salamone.

Early writings
Muscat's earliest extant writings date back to when he was twenty-three years old. A long poetic work in Italian, called Sonnetto (Sonnet), which he composed in 1758 was dedicated to Giammaria Azopardi Castelletti, Adriano Montana and Giuseppe Agius. The first was the Vicar General, and the others Assessors, to the Bishop of Malta Bartolomeo Rull. The work had never been published, and is extant in manuscript form. This document is evidence that Muscat did not harbour ‘dangerous’ doctrines (as came out afterwards) since always. During this period of his life he seems to have been quite convinced of the traditional political structures of his time and, particularly, with the supreme power exerted by the pope.

Another early writing, this time from 1771, when Muscat had thirty-six years of age, is called Replica delli Creditori (A Creditors’ Response). This too is in Italian. It was published in Palermo, Sicily, at the printing press of Baron Giacomo Epir, and contains 87 pages. The work was written in response to a publication issued by a certain Giacobbe Berard, who had responded to yet another book. Muscat's book, in fact, reproduced the same title of Berard's work. The subject of all three publications concerned a particular legal case of localised importance. Nevertheless, in his book Muscat touches upon a theme pertaining to political philosophy which he would go on to develop in other writings, namely the legal independence of a local government from outside interference (including the pope, his bishops or the Inquisition.

Philosophical bearing
This was no transitory feeling which Muscat had expressed so boldly. His was a position emanating from the study of Illuminist writings. Indeed, here, as elsewhere, Muscat did not go as far as rejecting religion or calling forth the establishment of a republic. That would have been not only impractical in a society such as that of Malta but also probably did not tally with Muscat's own beliefs. In general, he seems to have believed in the political system adhered to by the Knights Hospitallers, albeit perhaps with a stronger dose of some egalitarian rights, and did not seem to have harbour any thoughts of overturning their government. As regards religion, he certainly seems to have been a deeply religious person, and his sole intensely felt objections seem to have been directed towards ecclesiastical and clerical authoritarianism and impertinence.

Nevertheless, Muscat certainly believed in the separation of Church and State, and, in later years, he also succeeded in gaining the ear of the Grand Masters of the Knights Hospitallers whom he served. Indeed, the Knights Hospitallers were a sort of religious order, and in this regard ultimately subject to the pope. Nevertheless, in matters pertaining to sovereign government, they could claim autonomy (just like other jurisdictions in Italy and elsewhere enjoyed).

Attorney General
In Malta’s current political context such a philosophy could have been explosive. However, for some time Muscat had no opportunity to put it into practice. That time came when the Grand Master of the Knights Hospitallers, Emmanuel de Rohan-Polduc, appointed him as his avvocato del principato (which more or less corresponds to the office of an Attorney General). This was at the beginning of Emmanuel de Rohan-Polduc’s reign, around 1775.

The potential menace did not escape the local inquisitor, Giovanni Filippo Gallarati Scotti, who said about Muscat: ‘Since some time ago, the ministers of this secular government, and especially the principality’s attorney general, seem to have changed their way of thinking. [...] The new spirit, which began to take hold of this man’s mind with the Grand Master’s approval, has come out with various decisions which are offensive to the liberty of the Church’.

The ‘offensive decisions’ which Scotti referred to were the attempts made by Muscat to curb the effective authority of the pope over the jurisdiction and deliberations of the local government. Certainly, he must have had Muscat's Replica in mind. All of this of course could not please the local inquisitor or the bishop.

Corroborative works

The inquisitor saw to it that his convictions became known to his authorities in Rome and to the Grand Master. He was not of course prepared to sit pretty while such an affront was levelled against the authority of the Church.

On the other hand, however, neither Muscat was ready to sit pretty. In fact, in the years which followed he intensified his assault by penning down other noteworthy works. The first seems to have appeared in 1779, called La Giurisprudenza Vindicata (A Reprisal for Jurisprudence). This is a 19-page booklet written in old Italian, and published at the printing press of the Knights Hospitallers under the direction of Giovanni Mallia. Its subtitle is simply Apologia (A Defence). The work is an unbroken discourse in twenty paragraphs dedicated to the Grand Master Emmanuel de Rohan-Polduc. Muscat's writing is elaborate and sometimes difficult to follow. Nevertheless, his message is clear enough. Muscat takes on his adversaries by insisting that they are calumnious and misrepresented his intentions. Of course, they hadn't. In fact, Muscat goes on to confirm and further substantiate the claims he had upheld in favour of the sovereignty and independence of Malta’s government in all decisions within his jurisdiction. While retracting not a single point of his philosophy, Muscat provides a long presentation on the origin of Roman law, and even presents the philosophical basis of his position.

Four years after this work, in 1783, Muscat goes on to publish Apologia a Favore dell’Inclita Nazione Maltese (A Defence in Favour of the Renowned Maltese Nation). The very words ‘Maltese nation’ must have sent shivers down the spines of both the local inquisitor and the bishop. These were definitely words with feared and hated illuminist overtones. Muscat's book, written in old Italian, has 124 pages, and (as if to add insult to injury) was published in Rome, Italy, at the printing press of the Lazzarini family. The above-mentioned title continues with the words ‘... Suoi Tribunali, Segnatura, e Legisti’ (... its Tribunals, its Secretariat of State, and its Law Consulates). The work is divided in three parts, each containing a number of chapters. Muscat composed it in response to a book, called Ragionamenti (Reasonings), by Giandonato Rogadeo, who sustained that the jurisdiction of Malta's government was limited by the supreme authority of the pope and by his institutions. With frank and candid language, and also with conviction and philosophical clarity, Muscat leaves no doubt on which side of the fence he stands.

Imposing works
If this was not enough to make both the local inquisitor and the bishop to go wild with anxiety, the year after the appearance of Muscat's Apologia a publication of great consequence was issued by the Grand Master, Emmanuel de Rohan-Polduc, in which Muscat's hand surely had a part. This was in 1784, and the publication was the Diritto Municipale di Malta (Malta's Domestic Law).

Usually called simply the Codice De Rohan, this book was basically a revision of the entire corpus of laws and legal customs of Malta. For its time it was a masterpiece of jurisprudence. However, in it the Catholic Church not only was she not given the absolute authority she expected to have but reasons were brought forward to retract some of the authority she still retained.

A second publication, issued two years later, in 1786, under the title Bando e Prammatica da Valere in Perpetuo (A Law and Procedure to Stand in Perpetuity), was even more explicit than the Diritto Municipale. It acknowledged that the prince had the right to sanction or abolish the execution of any legal instrument issued by a foreign authority, including the pope, the congregations of the Holy See, and the Inquisition.

Inquisitor Scotti identified Muscat as the one responsible for such pernicious doctrines. According to him, Muscat was one of "those modern philosophers of Malta" "cui il nome pur solo, e l’ombra della Chiesa, e delle Ecclesiastiche preprogative e invidioso e odiosissimo" (for whom the very name and the shadow of the Church, and of ecclesiastical prerogatives, is detestable and hateful).

Collision with the Church
To defend himself from such accusations, in 1788 Muscat published a tract entitled Memoria (A Memo). However, this did little to dissipate the opposition which had been building up against him. This was exacerbated a year later, in 1789, when Grand Master Emmanuel de Rohan-Polduc demanded the suspension of the notorious papal bull In Cœna Domini, and Muscat personally went to stop Bishop Vincenzo Labini from publicly reading the bull. Of course, though such a slur was not heeded by the bishop, the incident certainly did not improve things.

Muscat was determined to put into practice his philosophy. A little after the confrontation with the bishop, he informed the inquisitor that henceforth he would not submit any case before the pope, even those related to the faith, without first tendering them to the Grand Master for his approval. This sent the inquisitor up the wall.

First removal from office
Muscat was unrelenting in his attack. A few years after clashing with the inquisitor, in 1791, he became involved in another incident which tipped the scales. Muscat maintained that the Church could exert its jurisdiction solely in matters pertaining to the sacraments, the faith, morals, and ecclesiastical discipline.

This seemed to go over the top. Pope Pius VI threatened Grand Master Emmanuel de Rohan-Polduc that, if Muscat was not immediately removed from Attorney General, the Holy See will disband the order of Knights Hospitallers!

Though this was no light warning, Muscat defended himself most vigorously. He avowed to have been, was, and always will be, a true and faithful son of the Church. Of course, neither his faith nor his faithfulness was the point of the issue. Nevertheless, the inquisitor did not flinch from twisting the knife in the wound. He reminded the pope that, some time back, Muscat himself had declared that ‘This is no longer the century of the Church!’, and ‘If it were in my power I would leave the bishop with only the crosier and the mitre!’ The inquisitor went as far as to inform the pope that (as he had it from his spies), on receiving the news of his requested removal from office, Muscat stated: ‘Puh, as if this would make me lose my appetite!’

Muscat was removed from office in January 1792, and sent to live outside the walls of the capital city, Valletta.

Reinstatement and second removal
Despite his removal from office, Grand Master Emmanuel de Rohan-Polduc did not appoint anyone in his stead as Attorney General. He waited for the racket to settle down. Then, just three months after, in April 1792, he reinstated Muscat in his former offices.

True to form, Muscat's former impertinence resumed. Just two months later, in June 1792, the pope was compelled again to demand the Grand Master to remove him straight away from all government responsibilities. There was no choice in the matter for Emmanuel de Rohan-Polduc. This time around, he was also constrained in sending Muscat abroad.

Before leaving Malta, Muscat gathered all his dependencies and encouraged them not to fear acting as he had. He hoped to return in fifty days. However, he told them, even if this were not to be so, he confessed that he was proud to have pulled off ‘a glorious confrontation with the pope’.

Accorded full honours by the Grand Master, Muscat left Malta in July 1792.

Back to Malta
Muscat went to Naples, Italy, and then to Messina, Sicily. He returned to Malta in October 1792. Though he became once more part of government, Grand Master Emmanuel de Rohan-Polduc warned him to be prudent and stay out of the limelight. However, Muscat does not seem to have been a man to shy away from bothering the Church.

At one point, he denied the bishop the right to judge a case of divorce since he claimed that marriage was a social contract recognised only by the civil authority. This irked the bishop immensely. Later, defending his responsibility in resisting and curtailing the interference of Rome in the affairs of state, he publicly announced the ‘at long last the pope will have to relinquish all [the power] he has’. Muscat even went as far as to defend the Maltese from being arraigned before the ecclesiastical courts.

Embarrassing the Grand Master without end, Emmanuel de Rohan-Polduc resolved to give up trying to protect his subject any more.  Encouraged by this turn of events, the new local inquisitor, Giulio Carpegna, decided to act quickly. Lest Muscat could be able to backtrack the Grand Master, he wanted him definitely removed.

Second reinstatement and final removal
In the meantime, in July 1793, Muscat wrote the pope a Memorandum with the intention of restoring him to his former offices. He avowed his faithfulness to the pope and his resolution to defend the jurisdictional rights of the Catholic Church in Malta. ‘Every interference in the matters of the Church,’ he declared, ‘now seem absolutely dangerous because I see that they bring me between the Devil and the deep sea.’

The ruse seemed to have worked. For in September 1793, the Grand Master reinstated Muscat to all his former offices. To the great consternation of the inquisitor, the pope had actually given his blessing for such a restoration of Muscat's fortunes. The pope, however, had approved ‘on the condition that Muscat does not meddle with ecclesiastical affairs’.

The official reinstatement was carried out with great pomp and ceremony. Muscat himself declared that his enemies – all except ‘la briga papalina’ (the papist gang), meaning the Inquisition - were now no more.

Nonetheless, Inquisitor Carpegna was enemy more than Muscat thought. Just one month after the ostentatious reinstatement, he succeeded, around October 1793, in removing Muscat. This time for good. Despite being mercifully forestalled the humiliation of being deposed once more, Muscat was forced to retire against a pension.

Triumph with Napoleon
This time the inquisitor made sure that neither Grand Master Emmanuel de Rohan-Polduc nor his successor, Ferdinand von Hompesch zu Bolheim, would change their mind. In the meantime, Muscat was simply waiting in the wings to reclaim his honour.

A good moment came when, five years later, in July 1798, Napoleon Bonaparte brought to an end the 268-year era of the Knights Hospitallers in Malta, together with that of the local Inquisition. Muscat was actually part of the delegation aboard Napoleon Bonaparte’s ship, l’Orient, to negotiate the Knights Hospitallers’ capitulation.

During the next two months, during the French tenure of Malta, Muscat was appointed President of the Civil Courts. However, when the revolt against the Napoleonic forces began, in September 1798, he was forced to barricade himself within the walls of Valletta together with the French government.

Defeat and exile
Muscat remained blockaded until November 1798. On being constrained to leave the city, the British expeditionary force took him prisoner and incarcerated him on the island of Gozo. He remained there at least for two years, until around 1800. He was sixty-five years of age.

On his release, Muscat exiled himself and left Malta for Sardinia, off the Italian peninsula. Nothing is yet known of his whereabouts after that.

He probably died at Sardinia.

Appreciation
Gio' Nicolo' Muscat can certainly be described as a most outstanding and stupendous philosopher. He dared challenge the hegemony of the Catholic Church in an age when it was right across-the-board. What's more, he did this with philosophical acumen and perspicuity. His personality and contribution is all the more intriguing because he hailed from the lower classes of society, and not only made it to the top but also attempted to affect some real change by applying his philosophical knowledge to good effect.

Muscat's persona and endeavour came to light in 1993 by the splendid work done by historian Frans Chiappara. However, much more research work is needed to uncover the lacking documentary evidence which could substantiate the still unknown aspects of Muscat's interesting life, especially those (but not only) related to his last years away from Malta.

Also, the thorough study of the Diritto Municipale di Malta and the Bando e Prammatica is still to be made in order to establish the as yet unacknowledged contributions which Muscat made to these important 18th century documents.

Finally, it is a pity that Muscat's philosophy has still to be analysed holistically and critically. Undoubtedly, his vision and enterprise are worth discovering in their entirety, not only for their historical value but furthermore for their relevance today.

Works in chronological order

 1758 Sonnetto (Sonnet) 
 1771 Replica delli Creditori (A Creditors’ Response)
 1779 La Giurisprudenza Vindicata (A Reprisal for Jurisprudence)
 1783 Apologia a Favore dell’Inclita Nazione Maltese (A Defence in Favour of the Famed Maltese Nation) – Unacknowledged contributions
 1784 Diritto Municipale di Malta (Malta's Legal Code) – Unacknowledged contributions
 1786 Bando e Prammatica da Valere in Perpetuo (A Law and Procedure to Stand in Perpetuity).
 1788 Memoria (A Memo)
 1793 Memorandum (Memorandum)

References

Sources
 Frans Chiappara, ‘Gio. Nicolò Muscat’, Hospitaller Malta, ed. by V. Mallia-Milanes, Mireva Publications, Malta, 1993.
 Mark Montebello, Il-Ktieb tal-Filosofija f’Malta (A Source Book of Philosophy in Malta), PIN Publications, Malta, 2001.

See also
Philosophy in Malta

18th-century Maltese philosophers
People from Valletta
1735 births
1800s deaths